Hold Your Tongue is the debut studio album of Alter Natives, released in 1986 by SST Records.

Track listing

Personnel 
Adapted from the Hold Your Tongue liner notes.

Alter Natives
 Chris Bopst – bass guitar
 Greg Ottinger – guitar
 Jim Thomson – drums
 Eric Ungar – saxophone, flute

Production and additional personnel
 Alter Natives – production
 Richard Andrews – recording
 Eric Bopst – illustrations
 John Golden – mastering
 Ethan James – mixing, recording

Release history

References

External links 
 Hold Your Tongue at Bandcamp
 

1986 debut albums
Alter Natives albums
SST Records albums
Instrumental rock albums